Meltwater pulse 1A (MWP1a) is the name used by Quaternary geologists, paleoclimatologists, and oceanographers for a period of rapid post-glacial sea level rise, between 13,500 and 14,700 calendar years ago, during which global sea level rose between  and  in about 400–500 years, giving mean rates of roughly /yr. Meltwater pulse 1A is also known as catastrophic rise event 1 (CRE1) in the Caribbean Sea. The rates of sea level rise associated with meltwater pulse 1A are the highest known rates of post-glacial, eustatic sea level rise. Meltwater pulse 1A is also the most widely recognized and least disputed of the named, postglacial meltwater pulses. Other named, postglacial meltwater pulses are known most commonly as meltwater pulse 1A0 (meltwater pulse 19ka), meltwater pulse 1B, meltwater pulse 1C, meltwater pulse 1D, and meltwater pulse 2. It and these other periods of rapid sea level rise are known as meltwater pulses because the inferred cause of them was the rapid release of meltwater into the oceans from the collapse of continental ice sheets.

Sea level and timing

Meltwater pulse 1A occurred in a period of rising sea level and rapid climate change, known as Termination I, when the retreat of continental ice sheets was going on during the end of the last ice age. Several researchers have narrowed the period of the pulse to between 13,500 and 14,700 calendar years ago with its peak at about 13,800 calendar years ago. The start of this meltwater event coincides with or closely follows the abrupt onset of the Bølling-Allerød (B-A) interstadial and warming in the NorthGRIP ice core in Greenland at 14,600 calendar years ago. During meltwater pulse 1A, sea level is estimated to have risen at a rate of /yr. This rate of sea level rise was much larger than the rate of current sea level rise, which has been estimated to be in the region of /yr.

Source(s) of meltwater pulse 1A 
The source of meltwaters for meltwater pulse 1A and the path they took remains a matter of continuing controversy. The technique of sea-level fingerprinting has been used to argue that major contribution to this meltwater pulse came from Antarctica. On the other hand, other studies have argued for the Laurentide Ice Sheet in North America being the dominant source of this meltwater pulse. The magnitude of eustatic sea level rise during meltwater pulse 1A is a significant indicator of its sources. A eustatic sea level rise around  could plausibly be solely explained by a North American source. Ice sheet modelling work suggests that the abrupt onset of the Bølling-Allerød (B-A) may have triggered the separation of the Cordilleran ice sheet and Laurentide Ice Sheet (and the opening of the ice-free corridor) producing a major contribution to meltwater pulse 1A from the North American ice sheet. Besides the North American and Antarctic Ice Sheet, the Fennoscandian and Barents Sea Ice Sheet could also have contributed  to meltwater pulse 1A.

Mississippi River meltwater flood events 
In the case of the Mississippi River, the sediments of the Louisiana continental shelf and slope, including the Orca Basin, within the Gulf of Mexico preserve a variety of paleoclimate and paleohydrologic proxies. They have been used to reconstruct both the duration and discharge of Mississippi River meltwater events and superfloods for the Late glacial and postglacial periods, including the time of meltwater pulse 1A. The chronology of flooding events found by the study of numerous cores on the Louisiana continental shelf and slope are in agreement that the timing of meltwater pulses. For example, meltwater pulse 1A in the Barbados coral record matches quite well with a group of two Mississippi River meltwater flood events, MWF-3 (12,600 radiocarbon years ago); and MWF-4 (11,900 radiocarbon years ago). In addition, meltwater pulse 1B in the Barbados coral record matches a cluster of four Mississippi River superflood events, MWF-5, that occurred between 9,900 and 9,100 radiocarbon years ago. The discharge of water coursing down the Mississippi River during meltwater flood MWF-4 is estimated to have been 0.15 sverdrups (million cubic meters per second). This discharge is roughly equivalent to 50% of the global discharge during meltwater pulse 1A. This research also shows that the Mississippi meltwater flood MWF-4 occurred during the Allerød oscillation and had largely stopped before the beginning of the Younger Dryas stadial. The same research found an absence of meltwater floods discharging into the Gulf of Mexico from the Mississippi River for a period of time following meltwater flood MWF-4, known as the cessation event, that corresponds with the Younger Dryas stadial.

Prior to Mississippi River meltwater flood MWF-3, two other Mississippi River meltwater floods, MWF-2 and MWF-1, have been recognized. The first of these, MWF-1, consists of three separate, but closely spaced events that occurred between 16,000 and 15,450 (MWF-1a); 15,000 and 14,700 (MWF-1b); and 14,460 and 14,000 (MWF-1c) radiocarbon years ago. Each of these flood events had a discharge of about 0.08 to 0.09 sverdrups (million cubic meters per second). Collectively, they appear to be associated with meltwater pulse 1A0. Later, one of the largest of the Mississippi River meltwater floods, MWF-2, occurred between 13,600 and 13,200 radiocarbon years ago. During its 400 radiocarbon year duration, the maximum discharge of Mississippi River meltwater flood MWF-2 is estimated to have been between 0.15 and 0.19 sverdrups. Despite the large size of Mississippi River meltwater flood MWF-2, it is not known to be associated with an identifiable meltwater pulse in any sea level record.

Antarctica iceberg discharge events 
With respect to the Antarctic Ice Sheet, research by Weber and others constructed a well-dated, high-resolution record of the discharge of icebergs from various parts of the Antarctic Ice Sheet for the past 20,000 calendar years, They constructed this record from variations in the amount of iceberg-rafted debris versus time and other environmental proxies in two cores taken from the ocean bottom within Iceberg Alley of the Weddell Sea. The sediments within Iceberg Alley provide a spatially integrated signal of the variability of the discharge of icebergs into the marine waters by the Antarctic Ice Sheet because it is a confluence zone in which icebergs calved from the entire Antarctic Ice Sheet drift along currents, converge, and exit the Weddell Sea to the north into the Scotia Sea.

Between 20,000 and 9,000 calendar years ago, this study documented eight well-defined periods of increased iceberg Ice calving and discharge from various parts of the Antarctic Ice Sheet. The highest period of discharge of icebergs recorded in both cores is known as AID6 (Antarctic Iceberg Discharge event 6). AID6 has a relatively abrupt onset at about 15,000 calendar years ago. The peak interval of greatest iceberg discharge and flux from the Antarctic Ice sheet for AID6 is between about 14,800 and 14,400 calendar years ago. The peak discharge is followed by gradual decline in flux until 13,900 calendar years ago, when it abruptly ends. The peak period of iceberg discharge for AID6 is synchronous with the onset of the Bølling interstadial in the Northern Hemisphere meltwater pulse 1A. Weber and others estimated that the flux of icebergs from Antarctica during AID6 contributed a substantial (at least 50%) to the global mean sea-level rise that occurred during meltwater pulse 1A. These icebergs came from the widespread retreat of the Antarctic Ice Sheet at this time, including from the Mac Robertson Land region of the East Antarctic Ice Sheet; the Ross Sea sector of the West Antarctic Ice Sheet; and the Antarctic Peninsula Ice Sheet.

See also
 Deglaciation

References

External links 
 Gornitz, V. (2007) Sea Level Rise, After the Ice Melted and Today. Science Briefs, NASA's Goddard Space Flight Center. (January 2007)
 Gornitz, V. (2012) The Great Ice Meltdown and Rising Seas: Lessons for Tomorrow. Science Briefs, NASA's Goddard Space Flight Center. (June 2012)
 Liu, J.P. (2004) Western Pacific Postglacial Sea-level History., River, Delta, Sea Level Change, and Ocean Margin Research Center, Marine, Earth and Atmospheric Sciences, North Carolina State University, Raleigh, NC.

Glaciology
Oceanography
Paleoclimatology
Sea level